Landgraf is a surname. Notable people with the surname include:

Alberto Landgraf (born 1980), Brazilian chef
Arne Landgraf (born 1977), German rower
Brooks Landgraf (born 1981), American politician
Bruno Landgraf das Neves (born 1986), Brazilian athlete
Franz Landgraf (1888–1944), German general
John Landgraf (born 1962), American television executive
Günther Landgraf (1928-2006), German physicist
Kapulani Landgraf (born 1966), American artist
Katharina Landgraf (born 1954), German politician
Ken Landgraf (born 1950), American comic book illustrator
Lois Landgraf, American politician
Manuela Landgraf, German pair skater
Niklas Landgraf (born 1996), German footballer
Sigrid Landgraf (born 1969), German field hockey player
Stanley I. Landgraf (1925–1997), American businessman
Steffen Landgraf (born 1980), German athlete
Werner Landgraf (born 1959), German astrophysicist 
Willi Landgraf (born 1968), German footballer

The German noble title Landgraf is Landgrave in English.